Zinc finger protein 433 is a protein that in humans is encoded by the ZNF433 gene.

References

Further reading 

Human proteins